Midland can refer to one of two places in the Canadian province of New Brunswick:

Midland, Albert County, New Brunswick
Midland, Kings County, New Brunswick

See also 

List of communities in New Brunswick